Teresa Amy (15 October 1950 – 30 January 2017) was a Uruguayan teacher, poet, and translator.

Biography
Teresa Amy was born in Montevideo on 15 October 1950. She studied linguistics and translation at the University of the Republic. She lived in Prague, Czech Republic for a year, and attended Charles University, where she studied Czech language and grammar for foreigners. She also earned a diploma in French language translation from Alliance Française.

In 1995 she published her first book of poetry, entitled Corazón de roble. She followed this in subsequent years with the collections Merodeador y otros poemas, Cuaderno de las islas, Cortejo Mínimo, Jade, and Brilla: 20 poemas para Marco, and her poems appeared in several Uruguayan and foreign anthologies.

She prepared a selection of Macedonian poets, Sobre el hilo que se llama tiempo, and the Czech poetry anthologies Animales silenciosos and 20 del XX. In 2011 she published the poetry collection Jade, which received an Annual Literature Award from the Ministry of Education and Culture. In 2013 she published Un huésped en casa, memorias de una traducción, in which she analyzes the craft of translation.

Amy coordinated live reading cycles in Montevideo, such as "Poesía cuerpo a cuerpo" and "7 poetas capitales", with the participation of Idea Vilariño, among others. She took part in international poetry festivals such as the Poetic Evenings of Struga (Macedonia, 2001), Salida al Mar (Buenos Aires, Argentina, 2010), and the Carlos Pellicer Cámara Ibero-American Poetry Encounter (Villahermosa, Mexico, 2016).

She was married to the writer and journalist .

Teresa Amy died in Montevideo on 30 January 2017.

Critical reception
According to the critic and poet , "Teresa Amy's original place in current Uruguayan poetry is that of polyphony – the union of the many voices that can fit on the written page, including that of a tradition in dialogue with Eastern Europe, together with the baroque of the concept, and the voice of erudition." Fressia adds: "It is impossible, indeed, not to admire her skill with language, the wise interruptions of the syntactic flow, and the ability to create a narrative with a succession of nominal groups, as in her poem 'Inventario mediterráneo', an economy of language comparable only to the famous 'Le message' by Jacques Prévert."

Fellow translator, critic, and poet Roberto Appratto considers Amy's writing "concise and intense, attentive to the variations of sound of a word in different parts of a verse", revealing a "fiber of a poet". In his opinion, "She arrived at her best in her latest books (Cortejo mínimo, Jade, and Brilla)."

Works
 Corazón de roble (1995), poetry, Vintén Editor, 
 Retratos del Merodeador y otros poemas (1999), poetry, Vintén Editor, 
 La más larga de las noches (2002), translation – in collaboration with Alfredo Infanzón – of the work by Czech poet Jan Skácel, Editorial Ácrono, Mexico
 Lamento por Belgrado (2003), translation – in collaboration with Lazar Manojlovic – of Lament nad Beogradom by Serbian poet Miloš Crnjanski, Editorial Ácrono, Mexico
 Cuaderno de las islas (2003), poetry, Ediciones del Mirador, 
 Cortejo Mínimo (2005), poetic work that also contains a translation of "Salón de la luna" by Macedonian writer , Artefato, 
 Cincuenta poetas uruguayos del medio siglo (1955–2005) (2005), selection of Uruguayan poets, with prologue and notes by Gerardo Ciancio, Archivo General de la Nación, Centro de Difusión del Libro, Montevideo, 
 Jade (2011), poetry, Yagurú, 
 Un huésped en casa, memorias de una traducción (2013), Yagurú, 
 Brilla: 20 poemas para Marco (2014), poetry, Yagurú, 
 20 del XX: poetas checos (2017), selection and translation of 20 Czech poets, La Otra and Universidad Autónoma de Nuevo León, Monterrey,

References

External links
 

1950 births
2017 deaths
20th-century Uruguayan educators
21st-century translators
21st-century Uruguayan poets
Czech–Spanish translators
French–Spanish translators
Language teachers
Suicides in Uruguay
University of the Republic (Uruguay) alumni
Uruguayan translators
Uruguayan women educators
Uruguayan women poets
Writers from Montevideo
20th-century Uruguayan poets
20th-century translators
20th-century Uruguayan women writers
21st-century Uruguayan women writers
21st-century Uruguayan educators
2017 suicides